David Joseph O'Halloran (born 27 October 2000) is an Irish cricketer. In February 2021, O'Halloran was named as part of the new intake for the Cricket Ireland Academy ahead of the 2021 season. He made his List A debut on 1 May 2021, for Leinster Lightning in the 2021 Inter-Provincial Cup. Later the same month, he was named as one of four additional players for Ireland's One Day International (ODI) series against the Netherlands. He made his Twenty20 debut on 18 June 2021, for Leinster Lightning in the 2021 Inter-Provincial Trophy.

References

External links
 

2000 births
Living people
Irish cricketers
Leinster Lightning cricketers
Cricketers from Dublin (city)